Tilo Schmitz (born 1959) is a German voice actor from Radebeul. Having a deep, sonorous, basso voice, Schmitz is the official dub-over artist of Christopher Judge, Michael Clarke Duncan, Ving Rhames, Abraham Benrubi and Ron Perlman.

Roles

Television animation
The Angry Beavers (Truckee)
Beast Machines (Optimus Primal)
Code Geass (Bismarck von Waldstein)
Digimon Adventure (Apocalymon)
Digimon Tamers (Baihumon)
Digimon Data Squad (Ivan)
Eureka Seven (Kengō)
Genshiken (Mitsunori Kugayama)
Ghost in the Shell: Stand Alone Complex (Batō)
Ghost in the Shell: S.A.C. 2nd GIG (Batō)
Invader Zim (Almighty Tallest Purple)
Looney Tunes (Yosemite Sam)
Lupin III (Daisuke Jigen)
Mighty Ducks (Check "Grin" Hardwing)
Sabrina, the Animated Series (Spookie Jar)
Shuriken School (Principal of Katana)
Transformers: Animated (Bulkhead)
The Wacky World of Tex Avery (Sagebrush Sid)

Original video animation
Aladdin and the King of Thieves (Cassim)
The Little Mermaid II: Return to the Sea (Undertow)
Mickey, Donald, Goofy: The Three Musketeers (Captain Pete)

Theatrical animation
Asterix and the Vikings (Obelix)
Asterix the Gaul (2001 dub) (Majestix)
Atlantis: The Lost Empire (Doctor Joshua Sweet)
Barnyard (Miles)
Beauty and the Beast (The Stove)
Bee Movie (Ken)
Big Hero 6 (Yama)
The Castle of Cagliostro (Daisuke Jigen)
Digimon: The Movie (Keramon, Infermon, Diaboromon)
Dragon Hunters (Fat John)
Ferdinand (Valiente's Father)
Final Fantasy: The Spirits Within (Ryan Whittaker)
Ghost in the Shell (Batō)
Ghost in the Shell 2: Innocence (Batō)
Ice Age: Continental Drift (Captain Gutt)
The Jungle Book 2 (Ranjan's Father)
Kung Fu Panda (Commander Vachir)
Lilo & Stitch (Cobra Bubbles)
Niko & The Way to the Stars (Leader)
Sinbad: Legend of the Seven Seas (Kale)
Sing (Big Daddy)
Spirit: Stallion of the Cimarron (Murphy)
Tangeld (Vladimir)
The Angry Birds Movie 2 (Hank)
The Ant Bully (The Glow Worm)
The Many Adventures of Winnie the Pooh (second dub) (Eeyore)
The SpongeBob SquarePants Movie (Dennis)
Team America: World Police (Spottswoode)
Titan A.E. (Professor Sam Tucker)
The Weathering Continent (Gaten Rakumu)
The Wild (Blag)

Video games
God of War (Kratos)
God of War II (Kratos)
Kingdom Hearts II (Pete)
Dragon Age II (Varric)
Dragon Age: Inquisition (Varric)
Star Wars Jedi Knight II: Jedi Outcast (Desann)
Destroy All Humans! (2020 video game) (Crypto 137)
Crysis (Prophet)

Live action
24 (excluding the first season) (David Palmer)
300 (King Leonidas)
Agent Cody Banks (Francois Molay)
Armageddon (Jayotis "Bear" Kurleenbear)
Buffy the Vampire Slayer (Adam)
Christopher Robin (Eeyore)
Close to Home (Detective Ed Williams)
Con Air (Nathan "Diamond Dog" Jones)
Daredevil (The Kingpin)
The Dark Knight (Tattooed Prisoner)
Die Another Day (Mister Kil)
Dinosaurs (Harris)
Dodgeball: A True Underdog Story (Me'Shell Jones)
Eragon (Ajihad)
Fantastic Four: Rise of the Silver Surfer (General Hager)
Flubber (Wesson)
Garfield: The Movie (Luca)
Goosebumps (German opening title narration)
The Golden Compass (Iorek Byrnison)
Hellboy (Hellboy)
Hellboy II: The Golden Army (Hellboy)
Homicide (Robert Randolph)
The Incredible Hulk (General Joe Geller)
The Island (Jamil Starkweather)
Kiss of Death (Omar)
Lemony Snicket's A Series of Unfortunate Events (Detective)
Léon (Malky)
A Life Less Ordinary (Jackson)
Looney Tunes: Back in Action (Yosemite Sam)
The Mummy (High Priest Imhotep)
Pirates of the Caribbean: The Curse of the Black Pearl (Bo'sun)
Planet of the Apes (Colonel Attar)
Pulp Fiction (Marsellus Wallace)
Pushing Daisies (Emerson Cod)
Scary Movie 4 (Shaquille O'Neal)
School for Scoundrels (Lesher)
The Scorpion King (Balthazar)
See Spot Run (Murdoch)
Sin City (Manute)
Spider-Man (Bonesaw McGraw)
Stargate SG-1 (Teal'c)
Starship Troopers (Sergeant Zim)
Star Trek: Deep Space Nine (Gul Dukat)
Talladega Nights: The Ballad of Ricky Bobby (Lucius Washington)
Wander Over Yonder (Lord Hater)
What's the Worst That Could Happen? (Uncle Jack)
The Whole Nine Yards (Franklin "Frankie Figs" Figueroa)
X-Men (Sabretooth)
Zathura: A Space Adventure (Robot)

References

External links
 Official website
 Tilo Schmitz at the German Dubbing Card Index
 
 
 

1959 births
German male voice actors
Living people